Rookie of the Year may refer to:

 Rookie of the Year (award), a sports award for the most outstanding rookie in a given season
 Rookie of the Year (film), a 1993 film starring Thomas Ian Nicholas
 Rookie of the Year (TV drama), a 1955 short film by John Ford, starring John Wayne
 Rookie of the Year (album) by rapper Ya Boy
 Rookie of the Year (band), an indie rock band from Fayetteville, North Carolina
 "Rookie of the Year", a song from Funeral for a Friend's album Casually Dressed & Deep in Conversation
 "Rookie of the Year", a song by Moneybagg Yo